The United Right of Albania (Partia e te Drejtave te Bashkuara Shqiptare)  is a political party in Albania.

References 

Political parties in Albania